Sleeps with Angels is the 20th studio album by Canadian musician Neil Young, released on August 16, 1994, on Reprise as a double LP and as a single CD. Co-produced by David Briggs, the album is Young's seventh with Crazy Horse.

Background and recording
The album was conceived as a conscious attempt to recapture some of the atmospheric experiments Young and Crazy Horse played around with in the After the Gold Rush era. Although the majority of the album was recorded before the fact, Young created the title track after the suicide of Kurt Cobain, who quoted him in his suicide note. Two songs ("Western Hero" and "Train of Love") feature the same music with differing lyrics. "Safeway Cart" is featured on the soundtrack during a marching sequence in Claire Denis's 1999 film Beau Travail.

Sleeps with Angels is the only Neil Young album on which he plays the flute.

Track listing
All tracks were written by Neil Young, except "Blue Eden", written by Young, Ralph Molina, Frank Sampedro and Billy Talbot.

Personnel
Neil Young – guitar on all tracks except 1 and 12, tack piano on tracks 1 and 12, accordion on track 5, flute on tracks 2 and 8, harmonica on track 8 and 12, vocals
Crazy Horse
Frank "Poncho" Sampedro – guitar on tracks 2, 4, 6, 7, 10, and 11, grand piano on tracks 5 and 9, piano on tracks 3 and 12, bass marimba on track 1, oberheim on tracks 3 and 8, Wurlitzer piano on track 8, vocals
Billy Talbot – bass on all tracks except 1 and 12, vibes on track 1, bass marimba on track 12, vocals
Ralph Molina – drums, vocals
Recording personnel
David Briggs – producer, mixing
Neil Young – producer, mixing
John Hanlon – engineer, mixing
Chad Blinman – assistant engineer
Roland Alvarez – assistant engineer
Joe Gastwirt – digital editing, mastering
Tim Mulligan – additional digital editing
Tim Foster – production manager
Bettina Briggs – production coordinator
Sal Trentino – amplifier tech
Jim Homan – guitar tech
Jerry Conforti – drum tech
Mark Humphreys – live monitors

Charts

Album

Singles

Certifications

References

Neil Young albums
1994 albums
Albums produced by David Briggs (producer)
Reprise Records albums
Albums produced by Neil Young
Crazy Horse (band) albums
Cultural depictions of Kurt Cobain